Iomazenil (also known as Ro16-0154, INN, USAN; benzodine) is an antagonist and partial inverse agonist of benzodiazepine and a potential treatment for alcohol use disorder. The compound was introduced in 1989 by pharmaceutical company Hoffmann-La Roche as an Iodine-123-labelled SPECT tracer for imaging benzodiazepine receptors (GABAA receptors) in the brain. Iomazenil is an analogue of flumazenil (Ro15-1788).

Use in brain research
123I-labelled iomazenil can be used to image epileptic seizure foci as an alternative to 18F-fludeoxyglucose PET imaging.

The effect of iomazenil of reducing levels of GABA in the brain was used by researchers to exacerbate symptoms in patients with schizophrenia in a laboratory study, supporting the theory that a GABA deficiency underlies that disease.

Alcohol treatment
Researchers at Yale University and Veterans Affairs Connecticut Healthcare System have been testing iomazenil as a potential treatment for drunkenness due to its ability to bind alcohol receptors in the brain.

See also 
 GABAA receptor negative allosteric modulator
 GABAA receptor § Ligands

References

External links 

 
 
 

Alcohol and health
Carboxylate esters
Ethyl esters
Convulsants
GABAA receptor negative allosteric modulators
Imidazobenzodiazepines
Iodoarenes